Fort Benning is a United States Army post near Columbus, Georgia, adjacent to the Alabama–Georgia border. Fort Benning supports more than 120,000 active-duty military, family members, reserve component soldiers, retirees and civilian employees on a daily basis. It is a power projection platform, and possesses the capability to deploy combat-ready forces by air, rail, and highway. Fort Benning is the home of the United States Army Maneuver Center of Excellence, the United States Army Armor School, United States Army Infantry School, the Western Hemisphere Institute for Security Cooperation (formerly known as the School of the Americas), elements of the 75th Ranger Regiment, the 1st Security Force Assistance Brigade, and other tenant units.

It is named after Henry L. Benning, a brigadier general in the Confederate States Army during the Civil War. Fort Benning is one of ten U.S. Army installations named for former Confederate generals. The National Defense Authorization Act for Fiscal Year 2021, passed over an attempted veto by President Trump, includes a provision that all 10 Army bases named after prominent Confederate military leaders be renamed. The congressionally mandated Naming Commission on 8 August 2022,  issued its recommendation that Fort Benning be renamed Fort Moore after Lieutenant General Hal and Julia Moore, both of whom are buried on post as are Julia’s parents. On 6 October 2022 Secretary of Defense Lloyd Austin accepted the recommendation and directed the name change occur no later than 1 January 2024. On 5 January 2023 William A. LaPlante, US under-secretary of defense for acquisition and sustainment (USD (A&S)) directed the full implementation of the recommendations of the Naming Commission, DoD-wide. The renaming to Fort Moore will occur in May 2023.

Since 1909, Fort Benning has served as the Home of the Infantry. Since 2005, Fort Benning has been transformed into the Maneuver Center of Excellence, as a result of the 2005 Base Realignment and Closure (BRAC) Commission's decision to consolidate a number of schools and installations to create various "centers of excellence". Included in this transformation was the move of the Armor School from Fort Knox to Fort Benning.

History

Camp Benning was established 19 October 1918, initially providing basic training for World War I units, post-war. Dwight D. Eisenhower served at Benning from 24 December 1918, until 15 March 1919, with about 250 of his Camp Colt, Pennsylvania tankers who transferred to Benning after the armistice. On 26 December 1918, a portion of the Camp Polk (near Raleigh, North Carolina) tank school was transferred to Camp Benning "to work in conjunction with the Infantry school". Camp Benning tank troops were moved to Camp Meade from 19–21 February 1919.

In February 1920, Congress voted to declare Camp Benning a permanent military post and appropriated more than $1 million of additional building funds for the Infantry School of Arms, which later became the Infantry School. By the fall of 1920, more than 350 officers, 7,000 troops and 650 student officers lived at Camp Benning. The post was renamed to Fort Benning in 1922, after Henry L. Benning, a general in the army of the Confederate States of America. Benning fought against U.S. Army troops in the Civil War as commander of Confederate States Army forces. In 1924, Brig. Gen. Briant H. Wells became the fourth commandant of the Infantry School and established the Wells Plan for permanent construction on the installation, emphasizing the importance of the outdoor environment and recreation opportunities for military personnel. During Wells' tenure, the post developed recreational facilities such as Doughboy Stadium, Gowdy Field, the post theater and Russ swimming pool. Doughboy Stadium was erected as a memorial by soldiers to their fallen comrades of World War I. One of the Doughboys' original coaches was a young captain named Dwight D. Eisenhower.

Lt. Col George C. Marshall was appointed assistant commandant of the post in 1927 and initiated major changes. Marshall, who later became the Army Chief of Staff during World War II, was appalled by the high casualties of World War I caused, he thought, by insufficient training. He was determined to prevent a lack of preparation from costing more lives in future conflicts. He and his subordinates revamped the education system at Fort Benning. The changes he fostered are still known as the Benning Revolution. Later in his life, Marshall went on to author the Marshall Plan for reviving postwar Europe and was awarded the Nobel Peace Prize in 1953.

In August 1940, 2 officers and 46 enlisted volunteers of what was known as the Parachute Test Platoon, after intensive training, made their first airborne jump over Lawson Field at Fort Benning. Observers from several countries including Germany and the Soviet Union attended. These 48 were the seed that grew into the branches of America's Airborne Infantry.

During World War II Fort Benning had 197,159 acres (797.87 km2) with billeting space for 3,970 officers and 94,873 enlisted persons. Among many other units, Fort Benning was the home of the 555th Parachute Infantry Battalion, whose training began in December 1943. The unit's formation was an important milestone for black Americans, as was explored in the first narrative history of the installation, Home of the Infantry. The battalion, later expanded to become the 555th Parachute Infantry Battalion and nicknamed the Triple Nickels, was trained at Fort Benning but did not deploy overseas and never saw combat during World War II. During this period, the specialized duties of the Triple Nickels were primarily in a firefighting role, with over one thousand parachute jumps as smoke jumpers. The 555th was deployed to the Pacific Northwest of the United States in response to the concern that forest fires were being set by the Japanese military using long-range incendiary balloons. The 82nd Armored Reconnaissance Battalion was activated 15 July 1940, and trained at the Fort. The 17th Armored Engineer Battalion became active and started training 15 July 1940.

On 28 March 1941, the body of Private Felix "Poss" Hall was found hanged in a shallow ravine near what is now Logan Avenue. Born 1 January 1922, in Millbrook, Alabama, he enlisted in the Army in August 1940. He was assigned to serve in the 24th Infantry Regiment at Fort Benning, an all-Black segregated unit formed after the Civil War. Two cousins and his best friend from Millbrook were also stationed at Fort Benning and bunked near him. Hall was known for being friendly and popular, and worked at the base sawmill. On 12 February he told his friends that he was headed to the post exchange for Black servicemen after his work shift. He was last seen alive around 4:00 p.m. in Block W, an all-white neighborhood between the mill and post exchange. He did not appear at bugle call the next morning, and was declared a deserter nearly a month after his disappearance. His body was found by soldiers on 28 March 1941, hanging against the edge of a ravine in a wooded area. His death was officially declared a homicide, although military officials speculated he had committed suicide. A Fort Benning physician examined his body on 8 April and ruled it a homicide. A 1/4 inch noose tied to a sapling was wrapped around his neck, his feet had been bound by baling wire and attached with a rope to other saplings, and his hands were tied behind him. The position of his feet indicated that he had attempted to pile dirt beneath his feet to help alleviate the pressure on his neck. His murder became widely reported in Black newspapers throughout the country, and the only known publicly available photograph of Felix was published in The Pittsburgh Courier. The FBI conducted a 17-month long investigation, but ultimately no one was charged for the murder of Hall. On 3 August 2021, the Army unveiled a marker in memory of Felix Hall at the site where he was last seen alive. A memorial event was also held during the unveiling of his marker. His name is inscribed at the National Memorial for Peace and Justice.

On 23 March 1941, Private Albert King, a Black serviceman, was killed by Sergeant Robert Lummus, who was White, following an altercation on a bus. After a night of drinking, King, Pfc. Lawrence Hoover, and their girlfriends, were riding on a bus around 3:30 am, back to their barracks. King was shouting and "cussing", according to the driver and other Black passengers. The driver stopped the bus near the Fort's gates and Sergeant Lummus, a Military Police motorcycle officer, boarded the bus. When Lummus tried to take King and Hoover off the bus, King ran out the front door, and Lummus hit Hoover with a blackjack. After taking Hoover into custody, Lummus later found a Black soldier walking back toward the main post. Lummus approached King and threatened to arrest him. When King claimed that Lummus could not do so, Lummus shot King five times, killing him. During the trial, later that day, it was claimed that King had drawn a pocket knife when approached by Lummus, though Hoover denied that King had a pocket knife with him. Lummus was found not guilty of murder and transferred the next day to Fort Knox.

At the start of the Korean War an Airborne Ranger Training Center was established by John G. Van Houten under the direction of J. Lawton Collins.

The 4th Infantry Division, first of four divisions committed by the United States to the North Atlantic Treaty Organization, reorganized and completed its basic training at Fort Benning (Sand Hill and Harmony Church areas) from October 1950 to May 1951, when it deployed to Germany for five years.

The Airborne School on Main Post has three 249-foot (76 m) drop towers called "Free Towers." They are used to train paratroopers. The towers were modeled after the parachute towers at the 1939 World's Fair in New York. Only three towers stand today; the fourth tower was toppled by a tornado on 14 March 1954.

During the spring of 1962 General Herbert B. Powell, Commanding General, U.S. Continental Army Command, directed that all instruction at the Infantry School after 1 July reflect Reorganization Objective Army Division structures. Therefore, the Infantry School asked for permission to reorganize the 1st Infantry Brigade under a ROAD structure. Instead, the Army Staff decided to inactivate the Pentomic-structured brigade and replace it with a new ROAD unit, the 197th Infantry Brigade, which resolved a unit designation issue. With the designation 1st Infantry Brigade slated to return to the 1st Infantry Division when it converted to ROAD, the existing unit at Fort Benning required a new title. The staff selected an infantry brigade number that had been associated with an Organized Reserve division that was no longer in the force. For the new ROAD brigade at Fort Benning, Georgia, the adjutant general on 1 August 1962, restored elements of the 99th Reconnaissance Troop, which thirty years earlier had been organized by consolidating infantry brigade headquarters and headquarters companies of the 99th Infantry Division, as Headquarters and Headquarters Companies, 197th and 198th Infantry Brigades.

Fort Benning was the site of the Scout dog school of the United States during the Vietnam War, where the dogs trained to detect ambushes in enemy terrain got their initial training, before being transferred to Vietnam for further advanced courses.

Fort Benning also had an urban village, McKenna Military Operations in Urban Terrain, built by Army engineers for urban training of soldiers. It was used for live, virtual and constructive experimentation on soldier systems, weapons, and equipment. The site was approximately 200 meters square, and included 15 buildings resembling a European village. There was a church, small houses, domestic residences and office-style buildings.

In 1984, following the signing of the Panama Canal Treaty, the School of the Americas relocated from Fort Gulick (Panama) to Fort Benning. After criticism concerning human rights violations committed by a number of graduates in Latin America, the school was renamed Western Hemisphere Institute for Security Cooperation.

As a result of national protests following the 25 May 2020, murder of George Floyd, an African American man, by Minneapolis police, Congress began to evaluate Democratic proposals to strip the names of Confederate leaders from military bases, including Fort Benning.

Commanding Generals

Post information
There are four main cantonment areas on Fort Benning: Main Post, Kelley Hill, Sand Hill, and Harmony Church.

Main Post
Main Post houses various garrison and smaller FORSCOM units of Fort Benning such as 14th Combat Support Hospital and 11th Engineer Battalion FORSCOM as well as a number of TRADOC-related tenants, e.g. the Officer Candidate School, the Non-Commissioned Officers Academy, and the Airborne School. McGinnis-Wickham Hall (formerly known as Infantry Hall) is the post headquarters and Maneuver Center of Excellence. Adjacent is the Ranger Memorial and the National Infantry Museum. The Army Infantry School conducts its graduations on Inouye Field, sprinkled with soil from the battlegrounds of Yorktown, Antietam, Soissons, Normandy, Corregidor, Korea, Vietnam, Iraq, and Afghanistan.

Kelley Hill

The 197th Infantry Brigade was located on Kelley Hill in the 1970s and early 1980s

Kelley Hill formerly housed the 3rd Brigade Combat Team of the 3rd Infantry Division (Mechanized), the parent unit of two combined armed battalions; 1st Battalion, 15th Infantry Regiment, 2nd Battalion, 69th Armor Regiment, as well as 3rd Squadron, 1st Cavalry Regiment, 1st Battalion, 10th Field Artillery Regiment, and two support battalions; the 203rd Brigade Support Battalion and the Special Troops Battalion, 3rd BCT. Included in the roster was the 179th Military Intelligence Detachment.

Between 11 December 2015, and 15 December 2015, the 3rd BCT's six subordinate battalions performed inactivation ceremonies on Sledgehammer Field. On 16 December 2015, 1st Battalion, 28th Infantry Regiment Task Force (or Task Force 1-28) was activated in its place. Task Force 1-28 is a 1053-member unit "made up of selected soldiers from the six inactivated battalions that formed the 3rd Brigade Combat Team, 3rd Infantry Division".

Sand Hill
Sand Hill is the primary location of the 198th Infantry Brigade and 197th Infantry Brigade responsible for training Infantry One Station Unit Training (OSUT). Its units include the following:

1st Battalion, 19th Infantry Regiment
2d Battalion, 19th Infantry Regiment
2d Battalion, 29th Infantry Regiment
1st Battalion, 46th Infantry Regiment
2d Battalion, 47th Infantry Regiment
3d Battalion, 47th Infantry Regiment
3d Battalion, 54th Infantry Regiment 
1st Battalion, 50th Infantry Regiment
2d Battalion, 54th Infantry Regiment
2d Battalion, 58th Infantry Regiment
30th AG Battalion (Reception)

Harmony Church
Harmony Church area houses the 194th Armored Brigade, 316th Cavalry Brigade Armor School and the first phase of Ranger School, 4th Ranger Training Battalion (ARTB). After the 2005 Base Realignment and Closure (BRAC) Commission's decision to create the Maneuver Center of Excellence (MCoE), Harmony Church is now the new home of the Armor School.

Command group

Current Command

 Commanding General, U.S. Army MCoE: Major General Curtis A. Buzzard
 Command Sergeant Major, U.S. Army MCoE: Command Sergeant Major Derrick C. Garner
 Deputy to the Commanding General, U.S. Army MCoE: Mr. Donald M. Sando
 Commandant, U.S. Army Infantry School: Major General Larry Q. Burris 
 Command Sergeant Major, U.S. Army Infantry School: Command Sergeant Major Christopher D. Gunn
 Commandant, U.S. Army Armor School: Brigadier General Thomas M. Feltey
 Command Sergeant Major, U.S. Army Armor School: Command Sergeant Major LeVaris J. Jackson
Deputy Commanding General, U.S. Army MCoE: Brigadier General Stephen E. Osborn
 Chief of Staff, U.S. Army MCoE: Colonel Ryan Wylie
 Garrison Commander, U.S. Army MCoE: Lieutenant Colonel Yolanda M. Edwards
 Garrison Command Sergeant Major, U.S. Army MCoE: Command Sergeant Major Michael D. Sanchez

Units and tenant units

Armor School move
Fort Benning was selected by the Base Realignment and Closing Commission to be the home of the new Maneuver Center of Excellence (MCoE). This realignment co-located the United States Army Armor Center and School, formerly located at Fort Knox, Kentucky, with the Infantry Center and School. This transformation was completed September 2011.

Education
The Department of Defense Education Activity (DoDEA) operates on-base schools for Fort Benning children:
 Faith Middle School
 McBride Elementary School
 Stowers Elementary School
 White Elementary School

High school students attend local public high schools operated by county governments. The portion in Muscogee County is zoned to high schools of Muscogee County Schools. The portion in Chattahoochie County is zoned to Chattahoochee County Schools.

Any Fort Benning pupil, however, may attend Muscogee County schools if their parents wish, as per House Bill 224.

See also
 17th Armored Engineer Battalion

References

External links
 
 Fort Benning Directorate of Family and Morale, Welfare and Recreation
 Fort Benning at www.georgiaencyclopedia.org
 Fort Benning Bayonet, the military-authorized newspaper
 FORSCOM homepage official site
 Post Headquarters - JAG historical marker
 The Infantry Board historical marker

Buildings and structures in Chattahoochee County, Georgia
Columbus, Georgia
Buildings and structures in Muscogee County, Georgia
Buildings and structures in Russell County, Alabama
United States Army posts
Training installations of the United States Army
Forts in Georgia (U.S. state)
Columbus metropolitan area, Georgia
Civilian Conservation Corps in Georgia (U.S. state)
Civilian Conservation Corps in Alabama
Populated places in Muscogee County, Georgia
Georgia populated places on the Chattahoochee River
Military installations established in 1909
1909 establishments in Georgia (U.S. state)
Military installations in Georgia (U.S. state)